Douglas Lewis (August 6, 1898 – February 19, 1981) was a welterweight professional boxer from Canada, who competed in the 1920s. Lewis trained out of Toronto's Praestamus Athletic Club, where Larry Gains also trained. He won the bronze medal in Boxing at the 1924 Summer Olympics in the welterweight division, losing against Jean Delarge in the semi-finals. He was born in Toronto, Ontario. After his boxing career, he moved to Los Angeles, California where he was a boxing trainer. In 1951, he obtained a patent for a new kind of boxing hand bandage.

References

External links
 Canadian Olympic Committee
 Box Rec Encyclopedia
 Ontario Birth Registrations
 1940 Census of Los Angeles
 California, Death Index, 1940-1997
 U.S. Patent Office

1898 births
1981 deaths
Boxers from Toronto
Boxers at the 1924 Summer Olympics
Olympic boxers of Canada
Olympic bronze medalists for Canada
Welterweight boxers
Olympic medalists in boxing
Canadian male boxers
Medalists at the 1924 Summer Olympics